Margaret Hotchkiss was a distinguished professor at the University of Kentucky. She is a microbiologist known for her work on bacteria in seawater and sewage, and fungi that cause disease. In 1957, she was elected a fellow of the American Academy of Microbiology.

Education and career 
Hotchkiss grew up in Brooklyn, New York, and graduated from Packer Collegiate Institute and Vassar College. In 1922, Hotchkiss earned a Ph.D. from Yale University. Hotchkiss worked at New York Medical College for seventeen years. She also worked at Woods Hole Oceanographic Institution as a visiting researcher, and was a bacteriologist at the New Jersey Agricultural Experiment Station, and the Department of Health in Paterson, New Jersey. In 1945 Hotchkiss joined the faculty at the University of Kentucky, where she was promoted to associate professor in 1946. She later became the head of the mycology department at the University of Kentucky, and was named a distinguished professor in 1962. Hotchkiss also served as the head of Sigma Xi, and the head of the Kentucky-Tennessee branch of the Society of American Bacteriologists. In 1964, Hotchkiss retired from teaching but continued conducting research.

Research 
For her Ph.D., Hotchkiss investigated the positive and negative effects of cations on bacterial growth. She then worked with Selman Waksman to assess whether bacteria in sea water could grow and differences in data obtained from visual examination of bacteria compared to growth of bacteria on agar plates. Her marine research included investigations into the nitrogen cycle mediated by bacteria in seawater, and in 1946 she continued her interest in seawater bacteria when she reviewed Claude ZoBell's Marine Microbiology book. Her subsequent research examined hexosidases in Escherichia coli, and the bacterial community in Imhoff tanks that are used for processing sewage. Having become interested in fungi that cause disease while working in New York, she later published on the bacteria found in the human mouth, and biomedical research on histoplasmosis and Nocardia. After retiring from teaching, she focused on using a precision microtome to slice through bacterial cells and investigated the internal structure of bacteria.

Selected publications

Awards and honors 
In 1957, Hotchkiss was a elected a charter fellow of the American Academy of Microbiology. In 1959, she was named to Who's Who to honor her contribution to education. The University of Kentucky named her as the 1962-1963 distinguished professor. She was elected a fellow of the New York Academy of Sciences.

References 

Fellows of the American Academy of Microbiology
Vassar College alumni
Yale University alumni
University of Kentucky faculty
Women microbiologists
People from Brooklyn
Year of birth missing (living people)
Living people